The 1922 World Allround Speed Skating Championships took place at 18 and 19 February 1922 at the ice rink Frogner Stadion in Kristiania, Norway. This was the first championship after the first world war. The previous championship was 8 years ago this is why there were so many skaters who took part for the first time.

Oscar Mathisen was defending champion but did not defend his title.
Harald Strøm became World champion for the first time.

Allround results 

  * = Fell
 NC = Not classified
 NF = Not finished
 NS = Not started
 DQ = Disqualified
Source: SpeedSkatingStats.com

Rules 
Four distances have to be skated:
 500m
 1500m
 5000m
 10000m

The ranking was made by award ranking points. The points were awarded to the skaters who had skated all the distances. The final ranking was then decided by ordering the skaters by lowest point totals.
 1 point for 1st place
 2 point for 2nd place
 3 point for 3rd place
 and so on

One could win the World Championships also by winning at least three of the four distances, so the ranking could be affected by this.

Silver and bronze medals were awarded.

References 

World Allround Speed Skating Championships, 1922
1922 World Allround
World Allround, 1922
International sports competitions in Oslo
1922 in Norwegian sport
February 1922 sports events
1920s in Oslo